A breastwork is a temporary fortification, often an earthwork thrown up to breast height to provide protection to defenders firing over it from a standing position. A more permanent structure, normally in stone, would be described as a parapet or the battlement of a castle wall.

In warships, a breastwork is the armored superstructure in the ship that did not extend all the way out to the sides of the ship. It was generally only used in ironclad turret ships designed between 1865 and 1880.

See also
List of established military terms (Fortifications)

Fortifications by type